The 1997–98 Copa del Rey was the 96th staging of the Copa del Rey.

The competition started on 3 September 1997 and concluded on 29 April 1998 with the final, held at the Mestalla Stadium in Valencia.

Format 

 All rounds are played over two legs apart the final which is played a single match in a neutral venue.
 In the event that aggregate scores finish level, the away goals rule. (This rule applies also in extra time)
 In case of a tie on aggregate, will play an extra time of 30 minutes, and if no goals are scored during extra time, the tie is decided by penalty shootout.
 The winners of the competition will earn a place in the group stage of next season's UEFA Cup, if they have not already qualified for European competition, if so then the runners-up will instead take this berth.
 The teams that play European competitions are exempt until the round of 16.
 Reserve teams are excluded from the tournament.

First round

Second round

Third round

Bracket

Round of 16 

|}

First leg

Second leg

Quarter-finals 

|}

First leg

Second leg

Semi-finals 

|}

First leg

Second leg

Final

Top goalscorers

References

External links 

  RSSSF
  Linguasport
  Dailymotion: Deportivo Alavés career cup 1997-98 (early rounds)

Copa del Rey seasons
1997–98 in Spanish football cups